Wang Di (born June 1968) is a Chinese diplomat and formerly the Chinese Ambassador to Kuwait. He previously served as deputy director of the Department of West Asian and North African Affairs of the Ministry of Foreign Affairs of the People's Republic of China.

References

External links

1968 births
Living people
Ambassadors of China to Kuwait